The Clyde Holliday State Recreation Site, part of the system of state parks managed by the Oregon Parks and Recreation Department, offers seasonal camping opportunities in a wooded tract along the John Day River near Mount Vernon.

Camping opportunities between March 1 and November 30 at the park include tenting, primitive camping, tepees, and recreational vehicles (RVs). Electric hookups, hot showers, flush toilets, and an RV dump station are available. Activities at the park include wildlife watching, fishing, horseshoes, picnics, music, and interpretive programs at an outdoor amphitheater.

See also
List of Oregon state parks

References

State parks of Oregon
Parks in Grant County, Oregon